The SNCF Class BB 66000 is a class of 318 centre cab diesel locomotives built for SNCF by a consortium of CAFL, CEM, Alsthom, Fives-Lille and SACM between 1960 and 1968.

Description
They were intended for shunting and trip working. Though designed as a mixed traffic locomotive, they had no provision for train heating and could be seen working with boiler vans on passenger services. With the general introduction of electric train heating they were relegated to freight work.

Under the original SNCF numbering scheme the first 80 locomotives were numbered 040 DG 1 to 040 DG 81.

Incidents
BB 66010 was withdrawn after a head-on collision on 15/10/81 with BB 67622.
BB 66132 was withdrawn after a collision on 29/09/73 with BB 66126 at Trappes.
BB 66247 was withdrawn after a fire on 12/01/1988, at St Denis-Jargeau.

Rebuilds
11 members of the class were rebuilt in the early 60s with a more powerful engine and designated Class BB 66600.

Between 1985 and 1989, 34 locomotives were regeared for higher tractive effort and designated as Class BB 66700.

From 2004 some 91 members of the class were rebuilt with new MTU engines and reclassified as BB 69200.

Preservation
9 examples have been preserved:
 BB 66001 : Preserved at Cité du train, Mulhouse
 BB 66014 : Preserved at Clermont-Ferrand 
 BB 66019 : Preserved at Écomusée du haut-pays et des transports, Breil-sur-Roya
 BB 66099 : Preserved at Train du pays Cathare et du Fenouillèdes
 BB 66105 : Preserved at Train du pays Cathare et du Fenouillèdes
 BB 66110 : Preserved by Meccoli
 BB 66130 : Preserved at Train du pays Cathare et du Fenouillèdes
 BB 66252 : Chemin de fer touristique du Vermandois
 BB 66304 : Preserved at Toulouse

References

66000
B-B locomotives
BB 66000
Standard gauge locomotives of France
Freight locomotives